Kenyan Weaks  (born August 13, 1977) is a retired American professional basketball player.  He is 1.98 m shooting guard–small forward.

References

External links
 Chowan coaching bio
 Florida Gators Bio
 Euroleague Profile

1977 births
Living people
ABA League players
African-American basketball players
American expatriate basketball people in Bulgaria
American expatriate basketball people in Greece
American expatriate basketball people in Israel
American expatriate basketball people in Slovenia
American expatriate basketball people in Turkey
American expatriate basketball people in Uruguay
American men's basketball players
Basketball players from North Carolina
Club Biguá de Villa Biarritz basketball players
Fenerbahçe men's basketball players
Florida Gators men's basketball players
Harlem Globetrotters players
Ionikos N.F. B.C. players
Ironi Ashkelon players
KK Zlatorog Laško players
PBC Academic players
People from Concord, North Carolina
Shooting guards
Small forwards
21st-century African-American sportspeople
20th-century African-American sportspeople